Phoenix Mills is a hamlet in the town of Middlefield, Otsego County, New York, United States. The ZIP code is 13326.

Notes

Hamlets in Otsego County, New York
Hamlets in New York (state)